The Proton-K, also designated Proton 8K82K after its GRAU index or SL-12 after its model number, 8K82K, was a Russian, previously Soviet, carrier rocket derived from the earlier Proton. It was built by Khrunichev, and launched from sites 81 and 200 at the Baikonur Cosmodrome in Kazakhstan.

The maiden flight on 10 March 1967 carried a Soyuz 7K-L1 as part of the Zond program. During the so-called Moon Race these Proton/Soyuz/Zond flights consisted of several uncrewed test flights of Soyuz spacecraft to highly elliptical or circumlunar orbits with the unrealized aim of landing Soviet cosmonauts on the Moon.

It was retired from service in favour of the modernised Proton-M, making its 310th and final launch on 30 March 2012.

Vehicle description 
The baseline Proton-K was a three-stage rocket. Thirty were launched in this configuration, with payloads including all of the Soviet Union's Salyut space stations, all Mir modules with the exception of the Docking Module, which was launched on the United States Space Shuttle, and the Zarya and Zvezda modules of the International Space Station. It was intended to launch Chelomey's crewed TKS spacecraft, and succeeded in launching four uncrewed tests flights prior to the program's cancellation. It was also intended for Chelomey's 20-ton LKS spaceplane that was never realised.

Like other members of the Universal Rocket family, the Proton-K was fuelled by Unsymmetrical dimethylhydrazine and nitrogen tetroxide. These were hypergolic fuels which burn on contact, avoiding the need for an ignition system, and can be stored at ambient temperatures. This avoids the need for low-temperature–tolerant components, and allowed the rocket to sit on the pad fully fuelled for long periods of time. In contrast, cryogenic fuels would have required periodic topping-up of propellants as they boil off. The fuels used on the Proton, were, however, corrosive and toxic and required special handling. The Russian Government paid for the cleanup of residual propellent in spent stages that impact downrange.

Proton components were built in factories near Moscow, then transported by rail to the final assembly point near the pad. The first stage of the Proton-K consisted of a central oxidiser tank, and six outrigger fuel tanks. This separated as one piece from the second stage, which was attached by means of a lattice structure interstage. The second stage ignited prior to first stage separation, and the top of the first stage was insulated to ensure that it retained its structural integrity until separation.

The first stage used six RD-253 engines, designed by Valentin Glushko. The RD-253 is a single-chamber engine and uses a staged combustion cycle. The first-stage guidance system was open-loop, which required significant amounts of propellant to be held in reserve.

The third stage was powered by an RD-0210 engine and four vernier nozzles, with common systems. The verniers provided steering, eliminating the need for gimballing of the main engine. They also aided stage separation, and acted as ullage motors. Ducts built into the structure channelled vernier exhaust before stage separation. The third stage guidance system was also used to control the first and second stages earlier in flight.

Many launches used an upper stage to boost the payload into a higher orbit. Blok D upper stages were used on forty flights, the majority of which were for the Luna and Zond programmes. Ten flights used the Blok D-1, mostly to launch spacecraft towards Venus. Blok D-2 upper stages were used three times, with the Fobos 1, Fobos 2 and Mars 96 spacecraft. The Blok DM upper stage was used on 66 launches. The most commonly used upper stage was the Blok DM-2, which was used on 109 flights, mostly with GLONASS and Raduga satellites. Fifteen launches used the modernised Block DM-2M stage, mostly carrying Ekspress satellites, however other satellites, including Eutelsat's SESAT 1, also used this configuration. Two Araks satellites were launched using Block DM-5 upper stages. The Block DM1, a commercial version of the DM-2, was used to launch Inmarsat-3 F2. The Block DM2 upper stage was used to launch three groups of seven Iridium satellites, including Iridium 33. This configuration was also used to launch Integral for the European Space Agency. Block DM3 stages were used on twenty five launches, almost exclusively carrying commercial satellites. Telstar 5 was launched with a Block DM4. The Briz-M upper stage was used for four launches; three carrying payloads for the Russian Government, and one commercial launch with GE-9 for GE Americom. One launch was reported to have used a Block DM-3 upper stage, however this may have been a reporting error, and it is unclear whether this launch actually used a DM-3, DM3, or DM-2.

List of launches

Due to its rushed development, the Proton K launch vehicle had a low success rate initially. However, the issues were rectified and it went on to become one of the most widely used heavy launch vehicle.

Launch failures

Source

See also
Comparison of heavy lift launch systems
List of Proton launches

References

Universal Rocket (rocket family)
Space launch vehicles of Russia
Space launch vehicles of the Soviet Union
Vehicles introduced in 1967